Agaristina is a genus of tephritid  or fruit flies in the family Tephritidae.  It is considered a synonym to Magnimyiolia.

References

Trypetinae